The ninth season of the American comedy series Will & Grace premiered on September 28, 2017.  It comprised 16 episodes, and is the first of three reunion seasons following the series' eighth season in 2006. The season concluded on April 5, 2018.

Overview
Grace and Will, both in their late 40s, recently divorced and are now living together as they did in their 20s, 11 years after the series initial eight-year run. Now single, they discover that while they were married, the dating scene and the entire world had evolved. They must adapt to the changes while maintaining their boisterous sense of humor and wild adventures.

Production
In January 2017, NBC announced that Will & Grace would return for a 12-episode limited series during the 2017–18 season. At the time of the announcement, all four principal cast members (Debra Messing, Eric McCormack, Sean Hayes and Megan Mullally) had already confirmed their return to the revival. An additional four episodes were ordered on August 3, 2017, for a total of 16, as well as a tenth season.

Cast and characters

Main cast
 Eric McCormack as Will Truman
 Debra Messing as Grace Adler
 Megan Mullally as Karen Walker
 Sean Hayes as Jack McFarland

Recurring
 Ryan Pinkston as Drew
 Anthony Ramos as Tony
 Mary Pat Gleason as Bridget

Special guest stars
 Harry Connick Jr. as Dr. Marvin "Leo" Markus
 Michael Angarano as Elliot
 Jane Lynch as Roberta
 Andrew Rannells as Reggie
 Max Greenfield as Eli Wolff
 Leslie Jordan as Beverley Leslie
 Minnie Driver as Lorraine Finster
 Nick Offerman as Jackson Boudreaux
 Molly Shannon as Val Bassett
 Tim Bagley as Larry
 Jerry Levine as Joe
 Bobby Cannavale as Vince D'Angelo
 Jennifer Lopez as herself/Harlee Santos
 Leigh-Allyn Baker as Ellen
 Cheyenne Jackson as Michael
 Vanessa Bayer as Amy
 Alec Baldwin as Malcolm
 Robert Klein as Martin Adler
 Blythe Danner as Marilyn Truman
 Mary McCormack as Janet Adler
 Sara Rue as Joyce Adler

Guest cast
 Kyle Bornheimer as Lenny
 Charles C Stevenson Jr as Smitty
 Eddie Matos as Congressman Steve Sandoval
 Kate Micucci as a page at the White House
 Ben Platt as Blake
 Laura Kightlinger as Nurse Sheila
 Chris Redd as Alvin
 Ramone Hamilton as Jordan
 Jordan Julian as Tasha
 Jet Jurgensmeyer as Skip
 Natalie Dreyfuss as Emma
 Derek Gaines as Theodore
 Brian Posehn as Pete
 Mitch Silpa as Maitre D'
 Emilio Borelli as Mario D'Angelo
 Sterling Sulieman as Ryan
 Rose Abdoo as Aunt Rita
 Jack McGee as Officer Murphy
 Mackenzie Marsh as Angela
 Lauren Weedman as Cheryl
 Andy Buckley as Hank
 Barry Bostwick as Professor Jerry Wise
 Matt Letscher as James Wise
 Andy Favreau as JJ Wise
 Dan Bucatinsky as Neil
 Danielle Weeks as Morgan
 Carly Dutcher as Ilana
 Katarina Demetriades as Brianna
 Brian Jordan Alvarez as Estéfan Gloria

Episodes

Reception

Critical response
On Rotten Tomatoes the season has a rating of 88% based on 49 reviews, with an average rating of 6.98/10. The website's consensus reads, "Will & Grace reunites its ever-hilarious cast for a revival season that picks up right where the show left off 11 years ago -- adding a fresh relevance and a series of stories that make sharply funny use of the passage of time." On Metacritic, the season has a weighted average score of 73 out of 100, based on 27 critics, indicating "generally favorable reviews".

Ratings

References

2017 American television seasons
2018 American television seasons
9
Television episodes directed by James Burrows